Benjaminas is a masculine Lithuanian given name and may refer to:

Benjaminas Jakševičius (1895–1979), Lithuanian sculptor and partisan
Benjaminas Viluckis (born 1961), Lithuanian hammer thrower
Benjaminas Zelkevičius (born 1944), Lithuanian footballer and manager

Lithuanian masculine given names